The Returned and Services League of Australia (RSL) is a support organisation for people who have served or are serving in the Australian Defence Force.

Mission
The RSL's mission is to ensure that programs are in place for the well-being, care, compensation and commemoration of serving and ex-service Defence Force members and their dependants; and promote Government and community awareness of the need for a secure, stable and progressive Australia. However, even as late as the 1970s it was described as an "inherently conservative" organisation.

History

The League evolved out of concern for the welfare of returned servicemen from the First World War. In 1916, a conference at which representatives from Queensland, South Australia, Tasmania and Victoria were present recommended the formation of The Returned Sailors and Soldiers Imperial League of Australia (RSSILA). New South Wales was admitted to the League the following year and Western Australia in 1918. In 1927, the Australian Capital Territory formed a branch and was admitted. During the inter-war period 1919 to 1939, the RSSILA was recognised as the appropriate body to represent the interests of returned Australian service personnel in exchange for extending political cooperation to the Nationalist Party of Prime Minister Stanley Bruce. The RSSILA was noted for its right-wing politics, in 1919 drawing on its membership to form a 2,000-strong paramilitary force called the "Army to fight Bolshevism", and permitting various right-wing Australian militia groups access to its membership lists to convince returned servicemen to join them. In 1948, WW1 veteran and politician Fred Paterson was expelled from the organisation for being a communist.

In 1940, the name of the League changed to the Returned Sailors', Soldiers' and Airmen's Imperial League of Australia (RSSAILA). It changed again in 1965, to the Returned Services League of Australia (RSL). Two more name changes occurred: in 1983, to the Returned Services League of Australia (RSL) and in 1990, to the Returned & Services League of Australia Limited (RSL), a company limited by guarantee. The objects of the League remain relatively unchanged from its first incorporation. After the Second World War, amidst widespread antisemitism in Australia, the Returned Service League published antisemitic political cartoons encouraging the Australian government and Minister for Immigration Arthur Calwell to stem the flow of Jewish immigrants fleeing postwar violence.

RSL badge symbolism
At the top of the badge is a crown, signifying allegiance to the Crown. Below the crown are the national flowers of Australia, Wales, England, Scotland and Ireland: the wattle, leek, rose, thistle, and shamrock. In the centre of the badge are a sailor, soldier, airman and service woman marching with their arms linked, symbolising friendship and the unity of all services and all ranks in comradeship. The red of the badge symbolises the blood ties of war. The white background stands for the purity of motive and the rendering of service without personal gain. The blue is a symbol of willingness to render service to a comrade anywhere under the sky.

The badge may only be worn by members of the League: it is an offence under the laws of most Australian states and territories for an individual to wear an RSL badge (a) that has not been issued specifically to them by the RSL, and (b) unless they are entitled to wear the badge, at that time, under the rules of the League.

Influence
The influence of the League derives from its founding days organising rituals for ANZAC Day dawn services and marches, and Remembrance Day commemorations. However, even as early as the 1920s, the role of the League became controversial as some leagues banned women from attending the dawn service because of 'excessive wailing'. In addition to pressing for benefits for veterans, the organisation entered other areas of political debate. The RSL was politically conservative, Anglophilic, and monarchist.

In the 1970s and 1980s, many defence force personnel, including veterans of the Vietnam War, found the RSL – whose members had predominantly served in the Second World War – generally unwelcoming and disdaining of their service. Since the turn of the century, with the number of Second World War veterans in the RSL dwindling, Vietnam veterans and their contemporaries, along with ex-servicemen's wives, have become mainstays of the League.

The focus of the RSL has been on the welfare of Australian men and women who have served in the armed forces.  It has advocated for veterans' entitlements and the protection of former battlefields. Usually RSL members ensure that those who have served their country are commemorated by notifying funeral information and handing out poppies at the funeral.

Organisation

The League is overseen by a National Executive that consists of the National President; the Deputy National President; State Branch Presidents for New South Wales, Victoria, the Australian Capital Territory, Queensland, South Australia, Tasmania, and Western Australia; and the National Chief Executive Officer (CEO), the National Treasurer, the National Legal Adviser, the National Defence Adviser, and the Veterans' Affairs Adviser.

The National CEO has operational control of the National Office. In 2015 the National Office building, on Constitution Avenue, Campbell, in Canberra, was demolished. The site became a large apartment block, in which the office was located as of 2019.

In each state and territory has a branch of the League, with a similar hierarchical structure. Within each branch is a series of districts and sub-branches that serve the interests of members in a particular geographic area.

The naming of these branches and sub-branches should not be confused with the commercial entities generally called RSL Clubs. Ownership and operation of RSL and Services clubs differ from state to state. For example, RSL NSW and its sub-Branches do not own or operate any registered clubs, nor do they own or operate poker machines however RSL Victoria sub-Branches do.

Controversy involving RSL New South Wales councillors
On 4 October 2016, the Sydney Morning Herald and ABC News reported that RSL national president Rod White, a retired major of the Australian Army Reserve, received a share in nearly $1 million of consulting fees paid by an arm of the League, RSL LifeCare, and failed to disclose conflicts of interest. 
Mr White denied any wrongdoing and was quoted as saying, when questioned by an ABC News reporter: "I believe I have personally fulfilled my obligations legally and ethically and I'm just absolutely surprised at your questioning of my integrity in that regard".

In October 2016, legal advice commissioned by the RSL's New South Wales Branch indicated RSL New South Wales councillors, including Mr White, may have broken the law by receiving a share in $1 million of consulting fees while holding a voluntary position in the veteran's group: "It is possible, but not certain, that in doing so they did not meet one or more of their duties and obligations, or contravened the law."
Subsequently, calls were made for Mr White to step aside in order to rebuild public trust in the League.

On 7 November 2016, ABC News reported Mr White as being likely to stand down pending an investigation into the consultancy fee payments, and that new documents obtained by ABC revealed that the quantum of consultancy fees paid was "far greater than originally thought – totalling more than $2 million since 2007".

On Remembrance Day 2016, ABC News (Australia) reported that the New South Wales Branch of the RSL was at risk of losing its charity status as a result of the payment scandal and that the Australian Charities and Not-For-Profits Commission had written to the RSL "outlining its concerns that the league may not be meeting its obligations as a charity" and warning, as a worst case, that "the commission may use its powers to revoke the league's charity status if it finds evidence that the rules have been broken".

The RSL acting national president, Robert Dick, was subsequently reported as saying the league would be working with "regulatory bodies to deliver an appropriate corporate governance structure to ensure there is no maladministration in the NSW Branch. We are determined to expose any wrongdoing".

In March 2017, Mr White resigned as President of the RSL; he had held the position for eight months.

Licensed clubs

Licensed clubs were formed as commercial activities to initially provide services by sub-branches to their members, including providing an environment for the protection and promotion of the ideals of the ANZAC spirit and heritage. The venues were established to provide hospitality for war veterans and a place for comradeship. Often they were located on land granted by the state government. Over time these commercial entities, known generally as RSL Clubs (but also called Ex-Services, Memorial, Legion or other similar names) generated profits and often donated to local community services.

The membership base of the licensed clubs, totalling more than a million, differs significantly from membership of the Returned and Services League (RSL). Membership of the League does not automatically confer rights of entry or membership to a licensed club but in some jurisdictions clubs extend honorary membership to serving members of the ADF.

Licensed clubs operating under the RSL name usually have bar and dining facilities for their members and guests, and sometimes have extensive gambling areas. Each evening at 6.00 pm the Ode of Remembrance is read, followed by one minute's silence to honour those who died serving their country.

RSL NSW and its sub-Branches do not own or operate any registered clubs, nor do they own or operate poker machines.

Other commercial activities

RSL Care
The first RSL home for ex-servicemen was established in 1938. The affiliated organisation, which became RSL Care, had 26 facilities in 2011. Following a merger with the Royal District Nursing Service in Victoria, in 2016 it became RSL Care RDNS Limited, an Australian public company registered as a charity, trading as Bolton Clarke. With more than 28 retirement communities throughout Queensland and New South Wales and several others in development, it was one of Australia's largest providers of retirement living and aged care services.

RSL Cabs
Operating under a co-operative structure, in 1946 a group of returned servicemen established RSL Ex-Servicemen's Cabs & Co-Operative Members Limited to provide taxi services to Sydney. By the 1950s, the co-operative had expanded to more than 60 drivers.  it operated on a commercial basis in which drivers were not required to be members of the League.

RSL Art Union
Commenced in Queensland in 1956, the RSL Art Union is a lottery that raises funds to provide welfare services to ex-service men and women, their dependents and to other members of the community. A major prize of a luxury waterfront home on Queensland's Gold Coast is usually offered, together with a range of bonus prizes. , the RSL Art Union had provided since its inception A$80  million in prizes and had raised more than A$70 million for development and maintenance of RSL nursing homes, hospitals and centres, and retirement complexes for elderly people.

Notes

See also

 Remembrance Day

 Similar veterans' organisations
 American Legion
 Australian Legion
 Royal British Legion
 Royal New Zealand Returned and Services Association
 Royal Canadian Legion
 South African Legion

References

External links
RSL Australian Capital Territory website
RSL New South Wales website
RSL Queensland website
RSL South Australia website
RSL Tasmania website
RSL Victoria website
RSL Western Australia website
Among Mates – Culture Victoria video on the role and history of the RSL in Victoria and the foundation of the Caulfield branch.
RSL Art Union
RSL Angeles City Sub Branch Philippines
In Flanders Field
Poppies

1916 establishments in Australia
Advocacy groups in Australia
Aftermath of World War I
Australian veterans' organisations
Charities based in Australia
Lobbying organisations in Australia
Queensland Greats